Agioi Apostoloi ("Holy Apostles") is an unhabituated islet to the north of the western coast of Crete in the Aegean Sea. Administratively, it is within the municipality of Chania, in Chania regional unit.

See also
List of islands of Greece

Landforms of Chania (regional unit)
Uninhabited islands of Crete
Islands of Greece